Groo: The Game is a card game published by Archangel Studios in 1997 that is based on the comic book Groo the Wanderer by Sergio Aragonés.

Description
In Groo: The Game, 2–4 players vie to build a large town.

Components
The Basic Game contains:
60 cards, which include Groo Effects, Events, Buildings (each with a certain number of Victory Points), Troops, Wildcards, and one Groo card
 7 blank six-sided dice, and stickers to be applied to the dice
rule book
The game expansion published in 1997 contains 55 more cards.

Setup
Each player is dealt five cards.

Gameplay
Each turn, the active player may, if they wish
Discard cards
Draw enough cards to bring hand to five cards
Make one attack
The active player then MUST
Roll the dice to determine where Groo goes, and what resources the player receives
Allot the received resources
Pass any unused resources to the player on the left, who uses any and passes the remainder to the left, and so on.
If the active player has less than five cards, they draw enough to bring their hand back to five.

Victory conditions
The first player to build a town with buildings worth seven Victory Points or more is the winner.

Publication history
The first Groo the Wanderer comic by Sergio Aragonés appeared in the pages of Destroyer Duck #1 in 1981. In 1987, Aragonés and Ken Whitman designed Groo: The Game, which was published by Archangel Studios. An expansion set of 55 more cards was released ten years later, in 1997.

Reception
Groo: The Game was reviewed in Pyramid #28 (Nov 1997), which said "Good news to both Groo fans and Groo novices is that this is an excellent game. While not a collectible card game, there is already one expansion set, which is also highly recommended."

In Issue 8 of Backstab, the magazine's editor, Croc, noted that fans of the Groo comics would love the game, and that "most of the drawings are hilarious and very descriptive of the cards' effects." But overall Croc was not impressed, giving it a very poor rating of only 4 out of 10 and saying, "Groo is a nice game to pass a little time, but doesn't contain enough content to become a classic."

Reviews
Shadis #40

References

Card games introduced in 1997
Games based on comics